Red Victor 3 is the latest in a line of street legal cars named 'Red Victor' and is the brainchild of British mechanic Andy Frost (Autosports), creator and builder of Red Victor 1 and Red Victor 2. Built in conjunction with Wayne Allman, Jon Webster and Dale Edmonds and Darryl Coleman, the work on the car took three years, and it was completed in June 2012. It completed the Santa Pod Raceway quarter mile track in 6.40s at 225 mph in 2013 and 6.59 seconds at 220 mph in 2012.

Statistics

Engine

Engine: your nans Chevrolet V8.
Block: New Century ZL1 aluminium water block. Built by Marc Lamude of Lamude Racing Engines.
 
Heads: Billet aluminium GM Chevrolet c/w Victory Performance titanium intake and titanium exhaust valves, Victory titanium retainers and locks. New Century fasteners, Cometic head gaskets. Fabricated Moroso rocker covers.
 
Valvetrain: T+ D shaft rockers, PAC valve springs, Manton 1/2”/7/16" pushrods.
 
Induction: Twin Precision Turbo Turbo 102mm Pro Mod turbos,custom Pro Alloy motorsport intake pipes, Wilson manifolds billet elbow and twin Wilson 105mm throttle bodies and twin Turbosmart Raceport BOV's.
 
Exhaust: Custom 321 stainless steel 2 ¼” dia manifolds and 4.5” dia silencers, all Zircotec ceramic coated. 2 x Turbosmart 60mm wastegates.
 
Crank: Winberg billet steel.
 
Cam and drive: Bullet 55mm solid roller,Jesel .937" dog bone roller lifters.New Century gear drive.
 
Con Rods: GRP billet aluminium c/w ARP 2000 bolts.
 
Pistons: Diamond Pistons custom c/w hard coat anodised and Teflon skirt coating, Trend casidium coated pins. Total Seal piston rings.
 
Fuel System: Waterman 25 GPM belt driven fuel pump, Bosch 044 primer pump, Aeromotive regulator, 8 Seimens 220 injectors, and 8 Billet Atomizer 700lb injectors, Twin Motec M800 ECU's with custom KA sensors, 10 gallon custom fuel tank, System 1 primary fuel filter into twin Protec filters, Goodridge lightweight G-line fuel transfer hose.
 
Fuel: Renegade Racing Fuels Pro Methanol. Renegade Pro 112+  or Shell V power for street.
 
Oil system: 4 stage reverse cam driven Aviaid dry sump system, Turbowerx turbo scavenge pump, Peterson 1.5 gallon oil tank, System 1 oil filter, Goodridge lightweight G-line oil transfer hose.
 
Ignition: Pantera EFI individual coils run by twin Motec M800 ECU's, Motec PDM and E888, Magnecor R100 10mm spark plug leads, NGK racing spark plugs Tuned by Shane Tecklenburg

Turbos

Twin Precision Turbo Gen 2 102mm Pro Mod turbos, custom built for RV3.

Miscellaneous
Car: 1972 Vauxhall VX4/90 FD VXR spec. Custom body from a std Vauxhall Victor cut and shaped by Intergalactic Custom shop, and a mould taken and done by DRE Fibreglass. Painted by DC Customs.

Figures and Records
Able to drive on the street and race in the FIA/MSA/NHRA Pro Modified class.
Worlds fastest street legal car as of November 2019. 5.87 @ 263.74 mph in the 1/4 mile.

References

External links 
Official Red Victor Website
Official Fuel Supplier

Individual cars